Coe House may refer to:

Amos B. Coe House, Minneapolis, Minnesota
Coe House (Grass Lake, Michigan), also known as the Henry and Aurora (Walker) Vinkle House
Coe House (Burkesville, Kentucky)
Coe Hall Historic House Museum in the Planting Fields Arboretum State Historic Park, Oyster Bay, New York
Joost Van Nuyse House, also known as the Ditmas Coe House, Flatlands, Brooklyn, New York
Coe House at the Gypsy Camp Historic District, Benton County, Arkansas